The Last Hour is a 1930 British comedy crime film directed by Walter Forde and starring Richard Cooper and Stewart Rome and Kathleen Vaughan. It is adapted from a successful play of the same title by Charles Bennett.

It was shot at Twickenham Studios. The film's sets were designed by William Saunders.

Cast
 Stewart Rome as Prince Nicola 
 Richard Cooper as Byron 
 Kathleen Vaughan as Mary Tregellis 
 Alexander Field as Smarty Walker 
 Wilfred Shine as Tregellis 
 James Raglan as Charles Lister 
 George Bealby as Blumfeld 
 Frank Arlton as George 
 Bill Shine as Ben

See also
List of lost films

References

Bibliography
 Low, Rachael. Filmmaking in 1930s Britain. George Allen & Unwin, 1985.
 Wood, Linda. British Films, 1927-1939. British Film Institute, 1986.

External links

1930 films
1930s crime comedy films
British crime comedy films
British black-and-white films
Butcher's Film Service films
1930 comedy films
Films directed by Walter Forde
1930s English-language films
1930s British films